Golchen is a municipality in the Mecklenburgische Seenplatte district, in Mecklenburg-Vorpommern, Germany.

Districts 
 Golchen
 Rohrsoll
 Ludwigshöhe
 Tückhude

References

External links